Michael Palin in North Korea (also known as North Korea: Michael Palin's Journey and North Korea From the Inside With Michael Palin) is a travel documentary presented by Michael Palin and first aired in the UK in 2 parts on Channel 5 on 20 September and 27 September 2018.

Programme history
The programme was made by ITN Productions, who had proposed a North Korean documentary to various channels under the title Let’s All Go To North Korea. Channel 5's Director of Programmes Ben Frow was not interested in the project at first, but after Michael Palin was hired to front the programme, he changed his mind and decided to commission it for the channel.

Michael Palin in North Korea recorded viewing figures of 4.5 million viewers and was nominated for two BAFTAs, while a 'special edition' featuring the first two parts and previously unseen footage was aired on Channel 5 on 27 December 2018.

Palin also wrote a companion book for the series, North Korea Journal.

In 2022, Channel 5 commissioned a follow-up from ITN Productions called Michael Palin: Into Iraq, which will see Palin crossing the country following the route of the Tigris river from its source at Lake Hazar in Turkey to the Persian Gulf. Similar to his previous trips, a companion book will also be released.

International airings 
The documentary aired on 30 September 2018, in North America on National Geographic with the title North Korea From the Inside With Michael Palin.

References

Further reading

External links

Palin's Travels – the official website

2018 British television series debuts
2018 British television series endings
2010s British documentary television series
2010s British travel television series
Television shows set in North Korea
Television shows filmed in China
Television shows filmed in North Korea
Works by Michael Palin